The Sailor with Golden Fists (Spanish:El marino de los puños de oro) is a 1968 Spanish comedy film directed by Rafael Gil and starring Pedro Carrasco, Sonia Bruno and Antonio Garisa.

Cast

References

Bibliography 
 Bentley, Bernard. A Companion to Spanish Cinema. Boydell & Brewer 2008.

External links 
 

1968 comedy films
Spanish comedy films
1968 films
1960s Spanish-language films
Films directed by Rafael Gil
1960s Spanish films